Acacia nova-anglica, commonly known as New England hickory, is a shrub belonging to the genus Acacia and the subgenus Phyllodineae that is endemic to eastern Australia.

Description
It has dark grey coloured bark that is finely or deeply fissured and dark-red, angled, glabrous branchlets. Like most species of Acacia it has phyllodes rather than true leaves. It blooms from January to March and produces inflorescences with spherical flower-heads containing 15 to 25 whitish to cream-coloureds flowers that are found in groups of 5 to 13 on axillary racemes. The brown seed pods that form after flowering and straight and flat but usually have one to three deep constrictions.

Distribution
It is native to an area on the New England Tableland of New South Wales from around Bendemeer in the south up to the Queensland border in the north and is particularly common in the Gibraltar Range. It is often found among granite outcrops or on exposed rocky hillsides and on granite ranges where it is part of medium or low dry sclerophyll forest or open woodland communities growing in sandy infertile soils.

See also
 List of Acacia species

References

nova-anglica
Flora of New South Wales